Tinissa cinerascens is a moth of the family Tineidae. It is found in New Guinea and surrounding islands and from the coasts of Queensland, Australia.

The larvae probably feed on fungi growing on trees in forests.

External links
Australian Faunal Directory
Moths of Australia

Moths of Australia
Scardiinae
Moths of New Guinea
Moths described in 1910